Bartym is a rural locality (a village) in Beryozovskoye Rural Settlement, Beryozovsky District, Perm Krai, Russia. The population was 55 as of 2010. There are 3 streets.

Geography 
Bartym is located on the Bartym River, 9 km northeast of  Beryozovka (the district's administrative centre) by road. Kopchikovo is the nearest rural locality.

References 

Rural localities in Beryozovsky District, Perm Krai